Formal sociology is a scientific approach to sociology developed by Georg Simmel and Leopold von Wiese. In his studies, Simmel was more focused on forms of social interactions rather than content. This is why his approach to sociology became labeled as formal sociology. In formal sociology, one formal concept can be applied to understand various events. From Simmel's point of view, one form of a social phenomenon is always associated with many formal events. The aim of formal sociology is to reveal that although the process of social interaction may be very complex, the social forms of these interactions can be isolated and may even be found to be identical.

References

Critical theory
Social change
Social concepts
Sociological theories